Nicole Bilderback (born June 10, 1975) is a Korean-born American actress, known for her recurring guest roles on the television programs Dark Angel and Dawson's Creek, and the films Bring It On and Bad Girls From Valley High (a.k.a. A Fate Totally Worse than Death).  She also was one of the Cordettes, Cordelia Chase's friends, on the Buffy the Vampire Slayer episode "The Wish" and the Unaired Buffy pilot. She also starred in a few episodes in season 6 of The Fresh Prince of Bel Air as Ashley's friend.

Life and career
Bilderback was born in Seoul, South Korea and raised in Tulsa, Oklahoma and Dallas, Texas. She was adopted by American parents Jim and Lois Bilderback,  through the Holt International Children's Services program. She was a cheerleader in junior high school and has two older brothers. She studied dancing from a very early age and at the age of 14 enrolled at the Dallas Young Actor's Studio. 

Upon graduation from Lake Highlands High School in 1993, Bilderback moved to Los Angeles to pursue a career in acting. She worked as a hostess at Jerry's Famous Deli in Studio City to make ends meet. Her first role came in 1995 when she appeared in the film Clueless, playing alongside Alicia Silverstone, Stacey Dash, Brittany Murphy, and Elisa Donovan. She also appeared in the Clueless television series for a three episode stint. She appeared on the August 2001 cover of KoreAm Journal, on issue 3 of the 2001 cover of Yolk, and as a medical student in House. Bilderback rode in the 2002 Lunar New Year Parade and Festival.

In 2014, she starred in the action movie Mercenaries, alongside Cynthia Rothrock, Brigitte Nielsen, Vivica A. Fox, Zoë Bell and Kristanna Loken.

Filmography

Film

Television

References

External links 
 Official site
 
 
 Nicole Bilderback AsianceMagazine.com Interview

1975 births
Living people
American film actresses
American television actresses
South Korean emigrants to the United States
American adoptees
Actresses from Dallas
20th-century American actresses
21st-century American actresses
21st-century South Korean actresses
American actresses of Korean descent
Actresses from Tulsa, Oklahoma